Bioče is a village nine miles northeast of Podgorica, Montenegro. It is situated on the main road connecting Podgorica with northern Montenegro and with Serbia (E65/E80) routes and is a local station on Belgrade–Bar railway.

On January 23, 2006, a train crashed nearby killing at least 39 and injuring more than 130 people, in the country's worst train disaster.

Demographics
According to the 2003 census, it had a population of 179, the majority of which identified as Serbs, the rest as Montenegrins.

According to the 2011 census, its population was 177.

References

Populated places in Podgorica Municipality
Serb communities in Montenegro